Berberis saxorum is a species of plant in the family Berberidaceae. It is endemic to Ecuador.  Its natural habitat is subtropical or tropical moist montane forests.

References

Endemic flora of Ecuador
saxorum
Data deficient plants
Taxonomy articles created by Polbot